Anolis rubribarbaris is a species of lizard in the family Dactyloidae. The species is found in Honduras.

References

Anoles
Reptiles described in 1999
Endemic fauna of Honduras
Reptiles of Honduras
Taxa named by Gunther Köhler
Taxa named by James Randall McCranie